C-C motif chemokine 11 also known as eosinophil chemotactic protein and eotaxin-1 is a protein that in humans is encoded by the CCL11 gene. This gene is encoded on three exons and is located on chromosome 17.

Function 

CCL11 is a small cytokine belonging to the CC chemokine family. CCL11 selectively recruits eosinophils by inducing their chemotaxis, and therefore, is implicated in allergic responses. The effects of CCL11 are mediated by its binding to a G-protein-linked receptor known as a chemokine receptor.  Chemokine receptors for which CCL11 is a ligand include CCR2, CCR3 and CCR5.  However, it has been found that eotaxin-1 (CCL11) has high degree selectivity for its receptor, such that they are inactive on neutrophils and monocytes, which do not express CCR3.

Clinical significance 

Increased CCL11 levels in blood plasma are associated with aging in mice and humans.  Additionally, it has been demonstrated that exposing young mice to CCL11 or the blood plasma of older mice decreases their neurogenesis and cognitive performance on behavioural tasks thought to be dependent on neurogenesis in the hippocampus.

Higher plasma concentrations of CCL11 have been found in current cannabis users compared to past users and those who had never used.  CCL11 has also been found in higher concentrations in people with schizophrenia; cannabis is a known trigger of schizophrenia.

It's also a biomarker for CTE or punch-drunk syndrome.

During periods of bone inflammation, CCL11 and CCR3 are upregulated. This is associated with an increase in osteoclast activity.

In 2022, Monje et al demonstrated that elevated levels of CCL11 may contribute to the brain fog associated with both chemotherapy and so-called Long Covid

References

External links

Further reading 

 
 
 
 
 
 
 
 
 
 
 
 
 
 
 
 
 
 
 
 

Cytokines
Aging-related proteins